The 1999–2000 season was Paris Saint-Germain's 30th season in existence. PSG played their home league games at the Parc des Princes in Paris, registering an average attendance of 43,185 spectators per match. The club was presided by Laurent Perpère and the team was coached by Philippe Bergeroo. Ali Benarbia was the team captain.

Players

First-team squad

Pre-season and friendlies

Competitions

Division 1

League table

Results summary

Results by round

Matches

Coupe de France

Coupe de la Ligue

References

External links

Official websites
PSG.FR - Site officiel du Paris Saint-Germain
Paris Saint-Germain - Ligue 1 
Paris Saint-Germain - UEFA.com

Paris Saint-Germain F.C. seasons
Paris Saint-Germain